Kanti Assembly constituency is an assembly constituency in Muzaffarpur district in the Indian state of Bihar. The current sitting MLA (member of legislative assembly) is Mohammad Israil Mansuri who won as an independent candidate defeating his nearest rival Ajit Kumar by 10000 votes.

Members of Legislative Assembly

Overview
As per Delimitation of Parliamentary and Assembly constituencies Order, 2008, No. 95 Kanti Assembly constituency is composed of the following: Kanti and Marwan community development blocks.

Kanti Assembly constituency is part of No. 16 Vaishali (Lok Sabha constituency). and it's a Bhumihar dominated constituency.

Election results

1951-1972 
In the 1951 state assembly elections, Jamuna Prasad Tripathy (Yamuna Prasad Tripathy) of INC defeated Nagendra Prasad Singh (IND) by 3049 votes. In 1957 state assembly elections, Jamuna Prasad Tripathy (Yamuna Prasad Tripathy) of INC again won the Kanti assembly seat, defeating his nearest rival Yogendra Prasad Sharma by a close margin of 445 votes. In 1962 Jamuna Prasad Tripathy (Yamuna Prasad Tripathy) defeated Harihar Prasad Shahi by a margin of 2714 votes. M.P. Sinha was the congress candidate in 1967 election which he won by a huge margin of 31034 votes. In 1969 state assembly elections Harihar Prasad Shahi of LTC defeated 3 times INC MLA Jamuna Prasad Tripathy (Yamuna Prasad Tripathy). Shambhu Sharan Thakur of INC won the 1972 election by 1462 votes.

1977-2010
In the 2010 state assembly elections, Ajit Kumar of JD(U) won the Kanti assembly seat, defeating his nearest rival Md. Israil of RJD. Contests in most years were multi cornered but only winners and runners up are being mentioned. Ajit Kumar of JD(U) defeated Muhmad Haidar Azad of RJD in October 2005. Ajit Kumar representing LJP defeated Md. Jamal of RJD in February 2005. Gulam Jilani Warsi of RJD defeated Ajit Kumar of AJBP in 2000. Mufti Mohammad Quasim of Janata Dal defeated Ajit Kumar of Congress in 1995. Nalini Ranjan Singh of JD defeated Shambhu Sharan Thakur of Congress in 1990. Nalini Ranjan Singh representing SUC defeated Tarakeshari Sinha of LD in 1985 and Shambhu Sharan Thakur of Congress in 1980. Thakur Prasad Singh of JP defeated Nalini Ranjan Singh of SUC in 1977.

2015
In the 2015 Bihar Legislative Assembly election Ashok Kumar Choudhary won the seat by almost 10000 votes against Ajit Kumar.

2020

References

External links
 

Assembly constituencies of Bihar
Politics of Muzaffarpur district